María Alejandra Muñoz Seminario (born 18 December 1979) is an Ecuadorian politician and lawyer who was the 51st Vice President of Ecuador from July 2020 until May 2021. She is the third female to hold this position, after Rosalía Arteaga and Maria Alejandra Vicuña.

On 17 July 2020, Muñoz was elected as vice president by the National Assembly, after receiving 75 votes in favor of her election. She was sworn in on 22 July 2020.

Muñoz is married and has four children.

References 

1979 births
Living people
21st-century Ecuadorian politicians
21st-century Ecuadorian women politicians
People from Guayaquil
University of Salamanca alumni
Vice presidents of Ecuador
Women vice presidents